Ian Barclay was (born on 2 December 1938) is a Melbourne-based tennis coach.

Barclay was born in Melbourne, Australia. He coached a number of Victorian and Australian Junior Champions, singles and doubles, most notably Pat Cash.

He went on to be the National Junior Coach for the Lawn Tennis Association, where he remained for nine years before returning to Australia. As of 2010 he was still coaching and involved with junior development programs with Tennis Australia.

Coaching Highlights

References 

1938 births
Living people
Australian tennis coaches
Tennis players from Melbourne
Australian male tennis players